António Ole (born 1951) is an Angolan artist, among the best known in the country. He represented Angola at the 2017 Venice Biennale.

Ole's first international exhibition was in 1984 at the Los Angeles Museum of African American Art. He showed work at the Havana Biennial and Johannesburg Biennial. Ole participated in the African delegation to the 1992 International Exhibition of Seville. In addition to painting and other visual mediums, Ole also works in photography and videography. His photographs were displayed at the 2015 Venice Biennale and the following Biennale showed several of his films: Carnaval da Vitória (short film on Angola's post-independence carnival), Ritmo do N'Gola Ritmos (documentary on an Angolan band), No Caminho das Estrelas (documentary on Angolan president António Agostinho Neto), Conceição Tchiambula Um dia, Uma vida (documentary about a peasant), and Sem Título (poetic, ecological essay).

Career 
Antonio Ole was born in Luanda, Angola in 1951. He studied African-American Culture and Cinema at the University of California in Los Angeles. He also studied film at the American Film Institute in Los Angeles. Ole is known for his versatility as an artist, creating in many different mediums such as photography, cinema, painting, sculpture, and installation.

Selected filmography 
Railway Workers (1975)

Resistência popular em Benguel (1975)

Rhythm of N'Gola Rhythms (1978)

No Caminho Das Estrelas (1980)

Long Is the Evening, Quiet Is the Day (1983)

Sonangol, 10 Anos Mais Forte (1987)

Luanda (1995)

References

External links 

 

Living people
1951 births
People from Luanda
Angolan artists